The uninhabited Bird Islands are located in Foxe Basin, closer to the Melville Peninsula than to Baffin Island. They are part of the Qikiqtaaluk Region, in the Canadian territory of Nunavut.

References 

Islands of Foxe Basin
Uninhabited islands of Qikiqtaaluk Region